Kerbrat is a French surname.

People with the surname 

 Andy Kerbrat (born 1990), French politician
 Christophe Kerbrat (born 1986), French professional footballer
 Gérard Kerbrat (born 1956), French former professional racing cyclist
 Renaud Kerbrat, French gun designer and inventor

See also 

 Kebraty

Surnames
Surnames of French origin